Fudbalski klub Borac Klenak (Serbian Cyrillic: Фудбалски клуб Борац Кленак) is a semi-professional Serbian football club from the village of Klenak. They currently compete in PFL Sremska Mitrovica league, Serbia's 5th tier league.

History
The club was founded in 1925 in the village of Klenak at the initiative of Rade Brlažnik and Joca Klein. The first stadium was on the banks of the Sava river but was relocated in the late 1970s to its current location due to heavy floods. The stadium can support about 500 people. In addition to the senior section, the club has a cadet and veteran section. The club's most historic success was hosting a friendly match between their veterans and Red Star Belgrade's veterans led by Vladimir Petrović.

Club records
 PFL Sremska Mitrovica 2018-19 — 11th 
 PFL Sremska Mitrovica  2017-18 — 7th 
 PFL Sremska Mitrovica 2016-17 — 7th 
 Opstinska Liga Ruma-Irig (1. razred) 2012−13 — 7th
 Opstinska Liga Ruma-Irig — 1st
 Medjuopstinska Liga Srem 2015-16 — 1st

References

Football in Serbia